AD 4 was a common year starting on Wednesday or a leap year starting on Tuesday (link will display the full calendar) of the Julian calendar (the sources differ, see leap year error for further information) and a leap year starting on Tuesday of the Proleptic Julian calendar. In the Roman Empire, it was known as the Year of the Consulship of Catus and Saturninus (or, less frequently, year 757 Ab urbe condita). The denomination "AD 4" for this year has been used since the early medieval period, when the Anno Domini calendar era became the prevalent method in Europe for naming years.

Events

By place

Roman Empire 
 Emperor Augustus summons Tiberius to Rome, and names him his heir and future emperor.  At the same time, Agrippa Postumus, the last son of Marcus Vipsanius Agrippa, is also adopted and named as Augustus' heir.
 Tiberius also adopts Germanicus as his own heir.
 The Lex Aelia Sentia regulates the manumission of slaves.
 A pact of non-aggression and friendship is signed between the Roman Empire, represented by Tiberius, and the German tribe the Cherusci, represented by their King Segimer. Arminius and Flavus, sons of Segimer, are brought into the Roman army as leaders of the auxiliary troops.
 Julia the Elder returns from exile to live in Rhegium in disgrace.
 Augustus pardons Gnaeus Cornelius Cinna Magnus, along with Aemilia Lepida, the granddaughter of Marcus Aemilius Lepidus, for alleged involvement in a conspiracy against the emperor.
 Livilla marries Drusus Julius Caesar, son of Tiberius.

Middle East 
 King Phraataces and Queen Musa of Parthia are overthrown and killed, the crown being offered to Orodes III of Parthia—the beginning of the interregnum.

Korea 
 Namhae Chachaung succeeds Bak Hyeokgeose as king of the Korean kingdom of Silla (traditional date).

China 
 Emperor Ping of Han marries Empress Wang (Ping), daughter of Wang Mang, cementing his influence.
 Wang Mang is given the title "superior duke".

By topic

Arts and sciences 
 Nicolaus of Damascus writes the 15-volume History of the World.

Births 
 Columella, Roman Latin writer (d. AD 70)
 Daemusin, Korean king of Goguryeo (d. AD 44)
 Publius Quinctilius Varus the Younger, Roman nobleman (d. AD 27)
 Possible date – Jesus, Jewish preacher and religious leader (executed c. AD 30/33)

Deaths 
 February 21 – Gaius Caesar, son of Marcus Vipsanius Agrippa and Julia the Elder (b. 20 BC)
 June 26 – Ariobarzanes II, Roman client king of Armenia (b. 40 BC)
 Gaius Asinius Pollio, Roman orator, poet and historian (b. 65 BC)
 Hyeokgeose, Korean king of Silla (b. 75 BC)
 Lucius Cornelius Lentulus, Roman consul

Notes

See also 
Ab urbe condita

References

Sources 

 

 

 

als:0er#Johr 4